Fred N. Tittle is an American politician. He served as a Democratic member for the 114th and 120th district of the Florida House of Representatives.

In 1970, Tittle was elected for the 114th district of the Florida House of Representatives. In 1972 Tittle was elected as the first representative for the newly-established 120th district, serving until 1974.

References 

Possibly living people
Place of birth missing (living people)
Year of birth missing (living people)
Democratic Party members of the Florida House of Representatives
20th-century American politicians